Seat Robert is a hill in the east of the English Lake District, south west of Shap, Cumbria. It is the subject of a chapter of Wainwright's book The Outlying Fells of Lakeland. It reaches , and has a cairn and an Ordnance Survey "ring" at ground level rather than the usual trig point column. The first section of his route follows the Old Corpse Road, a corpse road, along which corpses were carried from Mardale to be buried at Shap.

References

 

Fells of the Lake District